The 2016–17 Bangalore Super Division was the fourteenth season of the Bangalore Super Division which is the third tier of the Indian association football system and the top tier of the Karnataka football system. The season started on 23 January 2017 and ended on 19 March. Ozone FC were the defending champions. AGORC were promoted to Super Division after winning 'A' Division in 2015–16.

Madras Engineer Group (MEG) won the league securing 22 points in the league. MEG also won George Hoover cup defeating the runner-up Students Union 2–0. Dada Nabeel of Accountants General's Office Recreation Club, with eight goals, emerged as the top-scorer of the season. In the awards at the end of the season, Nardesh of Students Union was named the Best goalkeeper and MEG's Sukesh Leon, the Best playmaker. AGORC and DYES were relegated to A division for the next season.

Teams

Table

Results

Fixtures

Results table

Season statistics

Top scorers

Awards

References

Bangalore Super Division seasons
4